Zhao Zhongxian (born 30 January 1941) is a Chinese physicist. He is internationally known for his studies on High-temperature superconductivity (HTS).

He was a member of the 8th, 10th, 11th National Committee of the Chinese People's Political Consultative Conference. He was also an alternate member of the 15th CPC Central Committee.

Biography
Zhao was born in Xinmin, Liaoning, Manchukuo, on January 30, 1941. 

In 1959, he was accepted to the University of Science and Technology of China and graduated in 1964. After university, he was assigned to the  Institute of Physics, Chinese Academy of Sciences as a researcher.

In December 1973, he joined the Communist Party of China. That same year, he was sent abroad to study at the expense of the government. He was educated in the University of Cambridge from February 1974 to September 1975. In 1979, he became deputy director of Superconductor Classification Laboratory at the Institute of Physics, Chinese Academy of Sciences.  

In 1987 he was elected a fellow of the World Academy of Sciences (TWAS), and two years later he was elected a fellow of the World Ceramic Academy. In 1988, Chinese University of Hong Kong conferred on him an Honorary Doctor of Science. In 1991 he became a member of the Chinese Academy of Engineering. He was director of Division of Mathematics and Physics, Chinese Academy of Sciences from 1994 to 2000.

Papers
 
 
 Anisotropic Superconducting Critical Currents for in Situ Comosites Cu-Nb; Z. X. Zhao, C. G. Cui, S. Q. Gou, D. K. Finnemore and J. D. Verhoeven; Chinese Physics 5 (1985); 776.

Awards
 1997 and 2014 Science and Technology Award of the Ho Leung Ho Lee Foundation
 2015 Bernd T. Matthias Prize
 2016 Highest Science and Technology Award

References

External links
 Zhao Zhognxian on the Official website of the Institute of Physics, Chinese Academy of Sciences

1941 births
Living people
Alumni of the University of Cambridge
Members of the Chinese Academy of Sciences
People from Shenyang
Physicists from Liaoning
TWAS fellows
TWAS laureates
University of Science and Technology of China alumni